Cariblatta minima, the least yellow cockroach, is a species of cockroach in the family Ectobiidae. It is found in North America and the Caribbean.

References

Cockroaches
Articles created by Qbugbot
Insects described in 1916